Nucleotide diversity is a concept in molecular genetics which is used to measure the degree of polymorphism within a population.

One commonly used measure of nucleotide diversity was first introduced by Nei and Li in 1979.

 

The term in front of the sums guarantees an unbiased estimator, which does not depend on how many sequences you sample.

Nucleotide diversity is a measure of genetic variation.  It is usually associated with other statistical measures of population diversity, and is similar to expected heterozygosity.  This statistic may be used to monitor diversity within or between ecological populations, to examine the genetic variation in crops and related species, or to determine evolutionary relationships.

Nucleotide diversity can be calculated by examining the DNA sequences directly, or may be estimated from molecular marker data, such as Random Amplified Polymorphic DNA (RAPD) data  and Amplified Fragment Length Polymorphism (AFLP) data.

Software
 DnaSP — DNA Sequence Polymorphism, is a software package for the analysis of nucleotide polymorphism from aligned DNA sequence data.
 MEGA, Molecular Evolutionary Genetics Analysis, is a software package used for estimating rates of molecular evolution, as well as generating phylogenetic trees, and aligning DNA sequences.  Available for Windows, Linux and Mac OS X (since ver. 5.x).
 Arlequin3 software can be used for calculations of nucleotide diversity and a variety of other statistical tests for intra-population and inter-population analyses.  Available for Windows.
 Variscan
 R package PopGenome
 pixy
 R package QSutils

References

Molecular genetics